STS-39 was the twelfth mission of the NASA Space Shuttle Discovery, and the 40th orbital shuttle mission overall. The primary purpose of the mission was to conduct a variety of payload experiments for the U.S. Department of Defense (DoD).

Crew

Crew seating arrangements

Mission highlights 

Launch was originally scheduled for March 9, 1991, but during processing work at Pad LC-39A, significant cracks were found on all four lug hinges on the two external tank umbilical door drive mechanisms. NASA managers opted to roll back the vehicle to the Vehicle Assembly Building (VAB) on March 7, 1991, and then to Orbiter Processing Facility (OPF) for repair. The faulty hinges were replaced with units taken from orbiter Columbia, and reinforced. Discovery was returned to the pad on April 1, 1991, and the launch was rescheduled for April 23. The mission was again postponed when, during prelaunch external tank loading, a transducer on high-pressure oxidizer turbopump for main engine number three showed readings out of specification. The transducer and its cable harness were replaced and tested. The launch was rescheduled for April 28. Actual launch occurred at April 28, 1991, 7:33:14 a.m. EDT. Launch weight: .

STS-39 was a dedicated U.S. Department of Defense mission. Unclassified payload included Air Force Program-675 (AFP-675); Infrared Background Signature Survey (IBSS) with Critical ionization velocity (CIV), Chemical Release Observation (CRO) and Shuttle pallet satellite-II (SPAS-II) experiments; and Space Test Payload-1 (STP-1). Classified payload consisted of Multi-Purpose Release Canister (MPEC). Also on board was Radiation Monitoring Equipment-III (RME-III) and Cloud Logic to Optimize Use of Defense Systems-1A (CLOUDS-1A).

STS-39 was the first unclassified Department of Defense (DoD)-dedicated Space Shuttle mission. There had previously been seven Shuttle missions dedicated to the DoD, but those were considered classified and information about the operation or success of the payloads or experiments was not released. For STS-39, only the payload in the Multi-Purpose Experiment Canister (MPEC) was listed as classified. (Bluford reportedly launched the classified payload by himself while, according to another member of the crew, "the rest of us pretended not to notice".)

The crew was divided into two teams for around-the-clock operations. Among other activities, the crew made observations of the atmosphere and gas releases, Discoverys orbital environment,
and firings of the orbiter's engines, in wavelengths ranging from infrared to far ultraviolet. As part of the sophisticated experiments, five spacecraft or satellites were deployed from the payload bay, and one was retrieved later during the mission.

Carried in the orbiter's cargo bay were: Air Force Program-675 (AFP-675); Infrared Background Signature Survey (IBSS); Space Test Program-01 (STP-01); and the MPEC. Inside the crew cabin were the Cloud Logic to Optimize the Use of Defense Systems-1A (CLOUDS-1A) experiment and the Radiation Monitoring Equipment-III (RME-III).

The Remote Manipulator System (Canadarm) in the payload bay was used to deploy the Shuttle Pallet Satellite-II (SPAS-II), on which the IBSS was mounted. Among other observations, the SPAS-II/IBSS watched Discovery as it performed some orbital maneuvers including the "Malarkey Milkshake". The deployment of IBSS was delayed a day, until Flight Day Four, to give priority to the completion of the CIRRIS (Cryogenic Infrared Radiance Instrumentation for Shuttle) experiment which was depleting its liquid helium coolant supply faster than expected while making observations of auroral and airglow emissions.

As usual, crew members faced some unexpected challenges during the mission. After working only about four hours, two tape recorders could not be reactivated. The tape recorders were designed to record observations made by three instruments on AFP-675. In a complicated two-hour bypass repair operation, the astronauts had to route wires and attach a splice wire to a Ku-band antenna system so the data could be sent directly to a ground station.

The high orbital inclination of the mission, 57.01° with respect to the equator, allowed the crew to fly over most of Earth's large land masses and observe and record environmental resources and problem areas.

STS-39 landed on May 6, 1991, at 2:55:35 p.m. EDT, at Runway 15, Kennedy Space Center, Florida. Landing was diverted there because of unacceptably high winds at the planned landing site, Edwards Air Force Base, California. Landing weight: . Rollout distance: , rollout time: 55 seconds.

Gallery

See also 

 List of human spaceflights
 List of Space Shuttle missions
 Outline of space science
 Space Shuttle

References

External links 
 NASA mission summary 
 NASA Press Kit
 STS-39 Video Highlights

Space Shuttle missions
Spacecraft launched in 1991
Department of Defense Space Shuttle missions